Bodnariv is a village in Kalush Raion, Ivano-Frankivsk Oblast, Ukraine.

History 
Bednarów was part of Austrian Galicia and had a Greek Catholic church in 1900. 
The town's parish church was also burned down. Only 14 survived.

There is a monument in the town to Nazi collaborator Oleksandr Lutskyi, who was born in the village.

Notable residents 

 Celestyn Chołodecki
 Tomasz Chołodecki

References 

Villages in Kalush Raion
War crimes committed by the Ukrainian Insurgent Army